Henry Summers Brown (18 September 1907 – 1963) was a Scottish footballer who played as an inside forward for various clubs in the 1930s, including Hibernian, Darlington, Chesterfield, Plymouth Argyle and Reading. At Chesterfield, he was a member of the team that won the Football League Third Division North championship in 1935–36.

Honours 

Chesterfield
Football League Third Division North champions: 1935–36

External links 
Henry Brown, www.ihibs.co.uk

1907 births
1963 deaths
Footballers from Kirkcaldy
Scottish footballers
Association football inside forwards
Scottish Football League players
English Football League players
Hibernian F.C. players
Darlington F.C. players
Chesterfield F.C. players
Plymouth Argyle F.C. players
Reading F.C. players